Catacombs is a 1965 British horror film directed by Gordon Hessler and starring Gary Merrill, Georgina Cookson and Jane Merrow. It was known in the US as The Woman Who Wouldn't Die.

Production
The film was shot at Shepperton Studios with sets designed by the art director George Provis. Warner Brothers picked it up for distribution in the US.

Plot
A man who murders his wife is haunted by her, and eventually goes to his own death.

Cast
 Gary Merrill as Raymond Garth 
 Georgina Cookson as Ellen Garth 
 Jane Merrow as Alice Taylor 
 Neil McCallum as Richard 'Dick' Corbett 
 Rachel Thomas as Christine 
 Jack Train as Solicitor 
 Frederick Piper as Police Inspector Merkot

References

External links
 
Catacombs at BFI
Review of film at The New York Times

1965 films
1965 horror films
1960s supernatural horror films
British black-and-white films
British horror thriller films
British Lion Films films
British mystery thriller films
Films based on American novels
Films directed by Gordon Hessler
British supernatural thriller films
Uxoricide in fiction
Films shot at Shepperton Studios
1960s English-language films
1960s British films